This is a list of international visits undertaken by Colin Powell (in office 2001–2005) while serving as the United States Secretary of State. The list includes both private travel and official state visits. The list includes only foreign travel which the Secretary of State made during his tenure in the position.

Summary 
The number of visits per country where Secretary Powell traveled are:
 One visit to Albania, Algeria, Angola, Argentina, Australia, Bahamas, Bangladesh, Barbados, Botswana, Brazil, Brunei, Cambodia, Cape Verde, Colombia, Czech Republic, Denmark, Ecuador, El Salvador, Gabon, Georgia, Greenland, Grenada, Honduras, Iceland, Kazakhstan, Lithuania, Macedonia, Malaysia, Maldives, Mali, Nepal, Nicaragua, Nigeria, Oman, Philippines, Qatar, Senegal, Serbia and Montenegro, Singapore, Slovenia, Sri Lanka, Sudan, Sweden, Tunisia, Ukraine, Uzbekistan and Vietnam
 Two visits to Afghanistan, Bosnia and Herzegovina, Bulgaria, Chile, Haiti, Hungary, Ireland, Lebanon, Netherlands, Panama, Peru, Romania, Switzerland and Uganda
 Three visits to Indonesia, Iraq, Kenya, Morocco, Poland, South Africa, Syria, Thailand, the United Kingdom and Vatican City
 Four visits to India, Italy, Pakistan, Saudi Arabia and South Korea
 Five visits to Canada, China, Germany, Japan, Kuwait and Spain
 Six visits to France, Mexico and Russia
 Seven visits to Israel, Jordan and the Palestinian National Authority
 Eight visits to Belgium
 Nine visits to Egypt

Table

References

2001 beginnings
2005 endings
2000s in international relations
2000s politics-related lists
United States Secretary of State
S
United States diplomacy-related lists
|Powell
2000s timelines